Tom Carter (born January 20, 1968) is an American professional golfer. He was born in Abington, Pennsylvania.

Carter played on the Nationwide Tour in 2001-03 and 2005-09. He won three Nationwide Tour events in 2003 and that gave him an immediate promotion to the PGA Tour. He played on the PGA Tour for part of the 2003 season and all of 2004.

Professional wins (3)

Nationwide Tour wins (3)

Nationwide Tour playoff record (1–0)

Results in major championships

"T" = tied
Note: Carter only played in the U.S. Open.

See also
2003 Nationwide Tour graduates

External links

American male golfers
Temple Owls men's golfers
PGA Tour golfers
Korn Ferry Tour graduates
Golfers from Pennsylvania
1968 births
Living people